Pteronotropis is a genus of cyprinid fish endemic to the United States.

Characteristics 
The genus is characterized by a broad dark blue stripe along the side. The genus has large anal and dorsal fins, as well as a compressed body.

Species
There are currently 9 recognized species in this genus:
 Pteronotropis euryzonus (Suttkus, 1955) (Broadstripe shiner)
 Pteronotropis grandipinnis (D. S. Jordan, 1877) (Apalachee shiner)
 Pteronotropis hubbsi (R. M. Bailey & H. W. Robison, 1978) (Bluehead shiner)
 Pteronotropis hypselopterus (Günther, 1868) (Sailfin shiner)
 Pteronotropis merlini (Suttkus & Mettee, 2001) (Orangetail shiner)
 Pteronotropis metallicus (D. S. Jordan & Meek, 1884) (Metallic shiner)
 Pteronotropis signipinnis (R. M. Bailey & Suttkus, 1952) (Flagfin shiner)
 Pteronotropis stonei (Fowler, 1921) (Lowland shiner)
 Pteronotropis welaka (Evermann & Kendall, 1898) (Bluenose shiner)

References

 
Cyprinidae genera
Cyprinid fish of North America
Fish of the United States